Libi is a modern Jewish name (ליבי) according to various baby name sites. It is derived from the plural of the Hebrew word 'lev' (heart), which is 'libbot', leading it to be described as meaning "my heart". Alternatively, it has been listed as meaning "loved one", most likely deriving from Yiddish and the German word 'liebe'.

Libi is also rarely used as a variant of Libby, a diminutive of Elizabeth.

Libi in Arabic means 'Libyan' and is typically used as part of a surname for people of Libyan origin, al-Libi.

Given name
 Libi Haim (born 1984), Israeli volleyball player
 Libi Staiger, American actress

Surname
 Abd al-Muhsin Al-Libi (born 1966), Islamic terrorist
 Abdullah Said al Libi, Islamic terrorist
 Abu Anas al-Libi, Islamic terrorist
 Abu Faraj al-Libbi, Islamic terrorist
 Abu Habib al-Libi, Islamic terrorist
 Abu Laith al-Libi (1967–2008), Islamic terrorist
 Abu Yahya al-Libi (1963-2012), Islamic terrorist
 Ibn al-Shaykh al-Libi, Islamic terrorist
 Katiba al-Bittar al-Libi, Islamic terrorist
 Luqman al-Libi, Islamic terrorist
 Ben Ali Libi, also known as Michel Velleman, Dutch magician

References

Jewish given names
Hebrew-language given names
German given names
Arabic-language surnames
Nisbas
Libyan people
Toponymic surnames